The 1966 British Open Championship was held at the Lansdowne Club in London from 13–22 December 1965. Abdelfattah Abou Taleb won his third consecutive title defeating Aftab Jawaid. The competition came under criticism for the modern day physicality which increased the chances of players getting injured, in the first round Ward was taken to hospital following a head injury received whilst playing Jawaid. The champion Taleb also came under fire for his aggressive attitude, particularly in the final.

Seeds

Draw and results

First qualifying round

Second qualifying round

Main draw

Third Place
 Kamal Zaghloul beat  Tewfik Shafik 8-10 9-2 9-7 8-10 9-5
9-0 0-9 9-1 9-6

References

Men's British Open Championship
Men's British Open Squash Championship
Men's British Open Squash Championship
Men's British Open Squash Championship
Squash competitions in London